Wesley Koolhof and Neal Skupski defeated Dan Evans and John Peers in the final, 6–2, 4–6, [10–6] to win the men's doubles tennis title at the 2022 Canadian Open.

Rajeev Ram and Joe Salisbury were the defending champions, but lost in the second round to Ariel Behar and Gonzalo Escobar.

Seeds
The top four seeds received a bye into the second round.

Draw

Finals

Top half

Bottom half

Seeded teams
The following are the seeded teams, based on ATP rankings as of August 1, 2022.

Other entry information

Wild cards

Alternates

Protected ranking

Withdrawals
  Hubert Hurkacz /  John Isner → replaced by  Hubert Hurkacz /  Jan Zieliński
  Marko Stakusic /  Jaden Weekes → replaced by  Francisco Cerúndolo /  Diego Schwartzman

References

External links
Main draw

National Bank Open